Stuart Lang (born January 26, 1951), a former Canadian football wide receiver, was the head coach for the University of Guelph's football team, the Guelph Gryphons, until November 2015. Lang joined Guelph's coaching staff in 2009 as receivers coach before being promoted to head coach in March 2010. As a professional player, he played for eight seasons for the Edmonton Eskimos of the Canadian Football League, winning five Grey Cup championships. Collegiately, he played CIAU football for the Queen's Golden Gaels.

References

External links
Guelph profile

1951 births
Canadian football wide receivers
Edmonton Elks players
Living people
Players of Canadian football from Ontario
Queen's Golden Gaels football players
Guelph Gryphons football coaches